The Adlersberg is a hill in the Harz mountains of central Germany that lies south of Sieber in the district of Göttingen in Lower Saxony. It is 593.2 m high and is situated west of the Aschentalshalbe. It also separates the valley of Breitental ("wide valley") with its river, the Tiefenbeek, from the Langental ("long valley"). To the northwest the Adlersberg transitions to the Kloppstert and the Fissenkenkopf hills. Other nearby peaks are the Pagelsburg 1.2 km south, the Höxterberg 1.6 km southwest and the Großer Knollen 1.9 km southeast.

Sources 
 Topographic map 1:25000, No. 4328 Bad Lauterberg im Harz

Hills of the Harz
Hills of Lower Saxony
Göttingen (district)